Lightning sphere may refer to:

Ball lightning, a controversial atmospheric electrical phenomenon
Plasma globe, a decorative electrical device using high voltage discharge within a transparent enclosure containing an inert gas